PCHR may refer to:
 Palestinian Centre for Human Rights, an independent human rights organization
 Personal Child Health Record, in the United Kingdom
 Port Colborne Harbour Railway, an Ontario shortline railway